Vernon Taylor (born February 15, 1987) is an American basketball player who plays for Donar of the BNXT League.

Career
Taylor started his professional career in Finland with Säynätsalon Riento in 2011.

In 2015, Taylor signed with Kangoeroes Willebroek of the Belgian Pro Basketball League (PBL). He was named the MVP of Round 18 after having an index rating of 28 in a win against Liège Basket.

He signed for Okapi Aalstar in Belgium in 2016. Okapi re-signed him for the 2017–18 season.

Taylor started the 2018–19 season with Trefl Sopot in the Polish Basketball League (PLK). On 8 January 2019, he agreed with Sopot to leave the club. Late that month, Taylor signed with New Heroes Den Bosch which was looking for a replacement for injured Devon Van Oostrum.

In July 2019, he signed with Cypriotic team Keravnos.

On October 15, 2019, Taylor signed with Donar of the Dutch Basketball League (DBL) for the remainder of the 2019–20 season. The 2019–20 season was cancelled prematurely in March because of the COVID-19 pandemic. Taylor returned to the United States.

On July 6, 2020, Taylor signed in Switzerland with Union Neuchâtel of the Swiss Basketball League (SBL).

In August 2021, Taylor transferred to SAM Basket Massagno.

On August 8, 2022, Taylor returned to Donar by signing a one-year contract.

References

External links
RealGM profile
Troy Trojans bio

1987 births
Living people
American expatriate basketball people in Bulgaria
American expatriate basketball people in Finland
American expatriate basketball people in the Netherlands
American men's basketball players
Basketball players from South Carolina
BC Rilski Sportist players
Donar (basketball club) players
Dutch Basketball League players
Heroes Den Bosch players
Junior college men's basketball players in the United States
Kangoeroes Basket Mechelen players
Keravnos B.C. players
Kouvot players
Okapi Aalstar players
Point guards
Sagesse SC basketball players
SAM Basket players
Shooting guards
Spartanburg Methodist College alumni
Sportspeople from Charleston, South Carolina
Trefl Sopot players
Troy Trojans men's basketball players
Union Neuchâtel Basket players